Rountree is a surname. Notable people with the surname include:

Christopher Rountree, American conductor
Harry Rountree (1878–1950), British illustrator
J. L. Hunter "Red" Rountree (1911–2004), American folk hero
Jim Rountree (1936–2013), American football player
John H. Rountree (1805–1890), American judge, farmer, politician
Khalil Rountree (born 1990), American mixed martial artist
Larry Rountree III (born 1998), American football player
Leonidas Johnson Rountree (1868-1923), American politician
Lin Rountree (born 1971), American composer and record producer
Martha Rountree (1911–1999), American journalist
Mary Rountree (1922–2007), American baseball player
Tucker Rountree (born 1981), American songwriter
Walter B. Rountree (1903–1980), American football player
William J. Rountree (1882-? ) American Shipping company owner
William M. Rountree (1917–1995), American diplomat

See also 
 22082 Rountree, main-belt asteroid
 Roundtree (surname)
 Rowntree (disambiguation)